The Point Men is a 2001 action crime thriller film by John Glen, the director of all the James Bond films in the 1980s. He cast Maryam d'Abo, the leading Bond girl from his film The Living Daylights (1987), in a small role in this film.

Plot
Tony Eckhardt is shot in an anti-terrorist operation and insists that the man killed during the operation was not their intended target, the terrorist Amar Kamil. Kamil undergoes extensive facial reconstruction surgery to look like a man kidnapped to take the fall for an assassination planned to take place during an upcoming press conference. Members of the Israeli team are being killed off and Eckhardt pursues Kamil while hoping to stay alive to raise his unborn daughter.

Cast
Christopher Lambert - Tony Eckhardt
Kerry Fox - Maddy Hope
Vincent Regan - Amar Kamil
Cal Macaninch - Horst
Nicolas de Pruyssenaere - Peter Hauser
Donald Sumpter - Benni Baum
Maryam d'Abo - Francie Koln

External links 
 
 
 

2001 films
2001 action thriller films
2000s crime action films
2001 crime thriller films
British crime action films
French crime action films
French crime thriller films
French action thriller films
British crime thriller films
British action thriller films
Films about terrorism in Europe
Films directed by John Glen
Films set in Israel
Films set in Tel Aviv
Films set in Switzerland
Films set in Luxembourg
English-language French films
2000s English-language films
2000s British films
2000s French films